The 1814 Pennsylvania gubernatorial election occurred on October 11, 1814. After contemplating retirement, incumbent Democratic-Republican governor Simon Snyder instead chose to run for reelection. He earned a third term as the state's executive after defeating Federalist candidate Isaac Wayne, a former member of the Pennsylvania State Senate.

Results

*Note: Although Latimer ran as a Federalist, Wayne was the only Federalist to carry any counties, as shown on the map.

References

1814
Gubernatorial
Pennsylvania
November 1814 events